Enele Taufa (born 24 September 1984) is a Tongan rugby footballer who has represented Tonga at both rugby league and rugby union.

Background
Taufua was born in Ha'ateiho, Tonga

Rugby union
Taufa plays as a prop and was a member of the Tonga national rugby union team and participated at the 2007 Rugby World Cup. He plys his trade for local champions Sila Pelu Ua Rugby Club.

Rugby league
In 2006 he represented the Tonga national rugby league team at the Pacific Cup.

References

1984 births
Living people
Rugby union scrum-halves
Tongan rugby union players
Tonga international rugby union players
Tongan rugby league players
Tonga national rugby league team players
People from Tongatapu